Events from the year 1678 in art.

Events
Louis Chéron wins the Prix de Rome for a second time.

Works

Gianlorenzo Bernini - the Tomb of Pope Alexander VII (completed during this year)
Albrecht Kauw - Still Life
Murillo - The Immaculate Conception and The Christ Child Distributing Bread to Pilgrims
Ary de Vois - The scholar Adriaan van Beverland with a prostitute

Births
June 3 - Domenico Antonio Vaccaro, Italian painter, sculptor and architect (died 1745)
date unknown
Giovanni Francesco Bagnoli, Italian painter of still-life paintings (died 1713)
Antonio Baroni, Italian painter active in Verona (died 1746)
Carlo Bolognini, Italian painter of quadratura (died 1704)
François Coudray, French sculptor (died 1727)
Tommaso Dossi, Italian painter from Verona (died 1730)
Alexis Grimou, French painter (died 1733)
Bernardo Schiaffino, Italian sculptor (died 1725)
Alonso Miguel de Tovar, Spanish painter (died 1758)

Deaths
January 29 - Giulio Carpioni, Italian painter and etcher (born 1613)
January 20 - Antonio de Pereda, Spanish painter (born 1611)
April 13 - Pieter van Anraedt,  Dutch Golden Age painter of history scenes (born 1635)
April 22 - Sebastiano Mazzoni, Italian who painted with unresolved dynamism and from awkward perspectives (born 1611)
June
Pieter Jansz van Asch, Dutch painter (born 1603)
Otto Marseus van Schrieck, Dutch painter (born 1619)
July 26 - Orsola Maddalena Caccia, Italian woman painter (b. unknown)
September 1 - Jan Brueghel the Younger, Flemish painter (born 1601)
September 8 - Pietro della Vecchia, Italian painter of grotesque paintings and portraitures (born 1603)
October - Caesar van Everdingen, Dutch portrait painter (born 1616/1617)
October 12 - Pieter Codde, Dutch painter of genre works (born 1599)
October 18 - Jacob Jordaens, Flemish painter (born 1593)
October 19 - Samuel Dirksz van Hoogstraten, Dutch painter (born 1627)
November 20 - Karel Dujardin, Dutch animal and landscape painter (born 1626)
December 9 - Jürgen Ovens, German painter (born 1623)
date unknown
Dominique Barrière, French painter and engraver (born 1622)
Marco Boschini, Italian painter in Venice (born 1613)
Pierre Daret, French portrait painter and engraver (born 1604)
Bernabé de Ayala, Spanish historical painter (born 1600)
Domenico de Benedettis, Italian painter (born 1610)
Vicente Salvador Gómez, Spanish Baroque painter (born 1637)
Giulio Cesare Milani, Italian painter (born 1621)
Giacomo Torelli, Italian set designer and engraver (born 1608)
Giovanni Battista Falda, Italian engraver especially of contemporary and antique structures in Rome (born 1640)
Matthew Snelling, English miniature painter (born 1621)
Pieter Hermansz Verelst, Dutch Golden Age genre art painter (born 1618)
probable
Domenico Ambrogi, Italian painter from Bologna (born 1600)
Cornelis de Neve, Flemish portrait painter (born unknown)

 
Years of the 17th century in art
1670s in art